Tidbury Creek is a  long 2nd order tributary to the St. Jones River in Kent County, Delaware.

Variant names
According to the Geographic Names Information System, it has also been known historically as:  
Fidbury Branch
Tidburg Creek
Tidbury Branch

Course
Tidbury Creek rises about 0.5 miles north of Viola in Kent County, Delaware on the Hudson Branch and Heron Drain divides.  Tidbury Creek then flows east to meet the St. Jones River at Lebanon, Delaware.

Watershed
Tidbury Creek drains  of area, receives about 44.8 in/year of precipitation, has a topographic wetness index of 611.05 and is about 5.9% forested.

See also
List of Delaware rivers

Maps

References

Rivers of Delaware
Rivers of Kent County, Delaware
Tributaries of Delaware Bay